Alisa  is an Indonesian soap opera television series that was aired on RCTI from December 20, 2008 to April 23, 2009. It was produced by video productions house public distributor company network SinemArt, and directed by Desiana Larasati.

Cast
 Alyssa Soebandono as Alyssa
 Alyssa Soebandono (native name)
 Alisa (given name)
 Icha (stage name)
 Alyssa (other names)
 Christian Sugiono as Evan
 Nia Ramadhani as Natasha
 Ali Syakieb as Eric 
 Marcel Chandrawinata as Nono 
 Didi Riyadi as Freisco 
 Farish as Ardy
 Marcella Simon as Marcella
 Hanna Hasyim as Laksmi
 Riyanto RA as Sarwana
 Frans Tumbuan as Henri
 Shinta Muin as Lela
 Ana Pinem as Noor
 Ivanka Suwandi as Fiah
 Tengku Firmansyah as Sanjaya
 Jody (given name)
 Jay (stage name)
 Sanjaya (other names)
 Donna Harun as Sophia
 Cindy Fatika Sari as Riska
 Adjie Pangestu as Denny
 Rima Melati as Rima
 Mieke Widjaya as Larasati
 Olla Ramlan as Evan's Aunt

Plot
Alisa (Alyssa Soebandono) and Evan (Christian Sugiono) met in an unpleasant circumstance. Alisa, a beverage Sales Promotion Girl, bumped into Evan and knocked him down while casing a guy who stole her merchandise. Evan was furious. His suit was all wet, while at that time he was in a rush to meet a prospective client.

But destiny brought them back together. Alisa turns out to be one of Evan's student. Because of the bad first impression, both Alisa and Evan could never get along. They were always arguing. Alisa couldn't stand Evan's arrogant, playboy, rude, and degrading attitude towards people who are under his social status. Evan on the other hand, despised Alisa's know it all attitude, pride rebellious and no-respect behavior.

Alisa is a simple girl. She was forced to work odd jobs to pay for her daily expenses, as well as her father's medication. Alisa also worked as Natashass (Nia Ramadhani) washer. Natasha happened to be Evan's girlfriend, his main woman among all the ladies who surrounded him.

After a long and winding journey and time, Evan and Alisa, in the end, couldn't deny the feeling deep down inside that they were actually in love. They began dating and were preparing to tie the knot.

But, suddenly, a shocking truth emerged. Turns out, Evan and Alisa were siblings. Alisa was in fact the daughter of Henri, Evan's father, through an affair. The wedding had to be called off, Both were devastated.

How did the love story go? Will Evan and Alisa be together in the end? Or will they get back together with their previous lovers??

External links
 Alisa

Indonesian television soap operas